is the administrative centre of Midtre Gauldal municipality in Trøndelag county, Norway. The village is located in the Gauldalen valley at the confluence of the rivers Gaula and Sokna. The junction between the Dovrebanen and Rørosbanen railway lines is at Støren Station in the northern part of the village. Støren Church, a school, government services, and commercial and industrial sites are all located in the village.

Name
The village (and parish/municipality) was named after the old Støren farm, since the first Støren Church was built there.  The first element is staurr''' which means "pointed pole" and the last element is vin which means "meadow" or "pasture". The word staurr is probably referring to the pointed headland on which the church is located.  The two rivers that form this headland are the Gaula and Sokna''.

Media gallery

Popular culture
The Norwegian movie Bør Børson made Støren famous. In this movie, the protagonist, Bør Børson, is visiting a fictional Støren bakery.

References

Midtre Gauldal
Villages in Trøndelag